Peltarion is an AI software company with offices in Stockholm and London.

In June 2022, the company was acquired by the video game developer King, which is owned by Activision Blizzard.

History 
Peltarion was founded in 2004 by Luka Crnkovic-Friis and Måns Erlandsson. The company was originally an AI consultancy that helped Tesla Inc., General Electric, and the U.S. space agency NASA use neural networks. Since 2016, the company has built an AI platform which has been used to help doctors to segment cancer tumors and farmers to optimize yields.

Product 
The Peltarion Platform is a cloud-based operational AI platform that allows users to build and deploy deep learning models. 

The service offers an end-to-end platform that allows users do everything from pre-processing data to building models and producing them. All of this runs in the cloud and developers get access to a graphical user interface for building and testing their models.

Philosophy 
Peltarion has a strong philosophy behind the product and wants to advance humankind by bringing AI everywhere. Quote from chief executive Luka Crnkovic-Friis:

“AI-powered software shouldn’t be dominated by a few large technology companies. We strongly feel that the best way of making sure that the technology is used for good is to make sure that more people can use it.”

See also
Artificial intelligence
Deep learning
Artificial neural network
AI innovation of Sweden
Swedish AI council

References

External links
Peltarion website
Peltarion Platform
Software companies of Sweden
Companies based in Stockholm
2022 mergers and acquisitions